Hana Rural District may refer to:
 Hana Rural District (Fars Province)
 Hana Rural District (Isfahan Province)